Rukun 13 or Rukun Tiga Belas (The Thirteen Pillars) is a defunct Sarawakian organisation that existed from 1947 until 1950.

Formation 
This organisation was officially formed at the end of 1947 in opposition to the Cession to the United Kingdom in Sarawak. At first, the organisation had planned to kill the British Governor Sir Charles Noble Arden-Clarke but the plan never came to fruition. After Sir Arden-Clarke was transferred to the Gold Coast colony he was succeeded by Sir Duncan George Stewart.

The objective of the group is to establish a union with the newly independent Indonesia. However, the British decided to keep this information a secret so as not to blame the assassination on Indonesian nationalists and provoke a full-scale war with Indonesia.

Penalty and disestablishment 
After Duncan Stewart was fatally wounded by Rosli Dhobi and later died in Singapore General Hospital, the British arrested all Rukun 13 members by March 1950. The 2 main members of Rukun 13, Rosli Dhobi and Awang Rambli were sentenced to death together with 2 other people, Bujang Suntong and Morshidi Sidek who were not Rukun 13 members. The rest of the Rukun 13 members were jailed.

List of Rukun 13 members 
 Rosli Dhobi
 Awang Rambli Amit Mohd Deli
 Abg Ahmad
 Osman Dollah
 Morni Junit
 Jack Yusof
 Awang Osman
 Abg Han Abg Ahmad
 Wan Zin
 Che Alias Osman
 Tambek Adun
 Amin Jenal
 Abg Mat Sirat

References 

 Haji Nasir Haji Sulaiman/Mary Tan Swee Ee/Ros Maria Chin, Pendekatan Diagramatik Sejarah PMR, Sasbadi Press 
 Ramlah Binti Adam/Abdul Hakim Bin Samuri/Shakila Parween Binti Yacob/Muslimin Bin Fadzil, Sejarah Tingkatan 5, DBP 
 A documentary of Rosli Dhobi (Malay)

History of Sarawak
1947 establishments in Sarawak
Organizations established in 1947
Terrorism in Malaysia